Agonidium explanatum is a species of ground beetle in the subfamily Platyninae. It was described by Henry Walter Bates in 1889.

References

explanatum
Beetles described in 1889